Hrayr is an Armenian given name. Notable people with the name include:
 Hrayr Dzhoghk (1866–1904), Armenian military leader and strategist, fedayee, statesman, and teacher
 Hrayr Mkoyan (born 1986), Armenian footballer
 Hrayr Shahinian, American skull base surgeon
 Hrayr Tovmasyan (born 1970), president of Constitutional Court of Armenia

Armenian masculine given names